Amerikai Magyar Szó is a United States Hungarian language independent weekly newspaper published in New York City. The paper is published by the American Hungarian Federation, based in Washington, DC, a non-profit organization tracing its roots back to its founding in 1906.

Footnotes

External links
 American Hungarian Federation official website. American Hungarian Federation.org

Weekly newspapers published in the United States
Hungarian-American culture in New York (state)
Hungarian-language newspapers published in the United States
1906 establishments in the United States
Non-English-language newspapers published in New York (state)